Le Majordome is a 1965 French and Italian comedy film directed by Jean Delannoy.

Cast
Paul Meurisseas Léopold
Geneviève Page	as Agnès des Vallières
Paul Hubschmid	as Doctor Ventoux / Le 'chat'
Micheline Luccioni	as Arlette
Lutz Gabor as Fernand
Jacques Seiler	as Albert
Henri Lambert	as La Quille
Noël Roquevert	as De Royssac
Fernand Berset	as The giant
Paul Préboist as The butler of Ventoux
André Weber as Pellegrini

External links
 

1965 films
French comedy films
Italian comedy films
1960s French-language films
1965 comedy films
1960s French films
1960s Italian films